Oreomunnea is a genus of two species of flowering plants in the family Juglandaceae, native to southern Mexico and Central America, where they occur in montane rainforest.

They are large trees growing to 35 m tall, with pinnate leaves with four to eight leaflets; unlike most genera in the Juglandaceae, the leaves are arranged in opposite pairs. The fruit is a small nut about 1 cm diameter, with a three-lobed wing.

Species
 Oreomunnea mexicana (Standl.) J.-F.Leroy
 Oreomunnea pterocarpa Oerst.

References

 
Engelhardioideae
Fagales genera
Taxonomy articles created by Polbot